Lepidodasyidae is a family of worms belonging to the order Macrodasyida. The family consists of only one genus: Lepidodasys Remane, 1926.

References

Gastrotricha